Haplochrois picropa is a moth in the family Elachistidae. It was described by Edward Meyrick in 1921. It is found in Zimbabwe.

References

Natural History Museum Lepidoptera generic names catalog

Endemic fauna of Zimbabwe
Moths described in 1921
Elachistidae
Moths of Africa